Psychopedagogy is a combination of two main branches of study, pedagogy and psychology.

Some of the most influential authors in this field are Jean Piaget, David Ausubel, Jerome Bruner and Lev Vygotsky. Important contributions have also been made by Mary Warnock.

See also

Developmental psychology
Educational psychology
Learning theory (education)

External links
Associação Brasileira de Psicopedagogia
Espacio Psicopedagógico de Buenos Aires 
Centro Latinoamericano de Psicopedagogía 
 https://web.archive.org/web/20110203052216/http://us.macmillan.com/psychopedagogy
Psychopedagogy Degree 
Polskie Towarzystwo Psychopedagogiczne (Polish Society Psychopedagogical) 

Pedagogy
Educational psychology

ko:학습
he:למידה
ja:学習
zh:学习